Stephen S. Cushing (March 20, 1884 – September 23, 1957) was a Vermont attorney, businessman, judge, and politician.  He was a veteran of World War I, and his most notable government service was as an associate justice of the Vermont Supreme Court from 1952 to 1953.

Early life
Stephen Salisbury Cushing was born in Nashua, New Hampshire on March 20, 1884, the son of George R. and Catherine (Moran) Cushing.  He graduated from Laconia High School in 1902.  Cushing then attended Dartmouth College, from which he graduated with a Bachelor of Science degree in 1906.  After college, he moved to Vermont to teach school and study law, first with Alfred A. Hall, and then with Lee Stephen Tillotson.  He was admitted to the bar in 1909, and practiced in Newport, Vermont until 1910, when he relocated to St. Albans. He received a Master of Arts degree from Middlebury College in 1916.

Early career
A Republican, Cushing served as City Attorney of St. Albans from 1912 to 1915, and State's Attorney of Franklin County from 1914 to 1916.  He also served terms as a member of the St. Albans school board and the board's chairman, as well as a justice of the peace and a member of the city council.  From 1912 to 1921, Cushing served as a clerk for the legislative revision staff of the Vermont General Assembly.

Military service
Cushing was a longtime member of the Vermont National Guard.  He enlisted in Company B, 1st Vermont Infantry Regiment in 1906, and he advanced to corporal before receiving his commission as a second lieutenant.  After settling in St. Albans, he transferred his military membership to Company L.  In the years prior to World War I, he advanced through the ranks to major, and served in positions including aide-de-camp to the adjutant general and judge advocate of the Vermont National Guard.  Cushing served on active duty for the War Department as the U.S. Property and Disbursing Officer for Vermont and military aide to the governor, assisting to demobilize the National Guard following its Mexican border service during the Pancho Villa Expedition.  During World War I, he joined the office of the Army's Provost Marshal General, and his responsibilities included implementation of the Selective Service Act of 1917.  After the war he was one of the organizers of the American Legion in Vermont, and was a member of the Military Order of Foreign Wars and the Forty and Eight.

Continued career
Cushing served on the staff of the Vermont General Assembly as legislative draftsman from 1921 to 1931.  He was also active in several businesses, including managing the L. J. Morton store in St. Albans, and a vice president of the Franklin County Savings Bank and Trust Company and the St. Albans Cooperative Savings and Loan Association.  In 1926, he received his qualification as a certified public accountant.  From 1931 to 1932 he served on the Vermont Public Service Commission, and from 1932 to 1938 he was the commission's chairman.  He received the honorary degree of LL.D. from Norwich University in 1934.

Judicial career
In April 1938, Cushing was appointed a judge of the Vermont Superior Court.  He advanced by seniority to become the chief judge in 1949, and he served on the court until 1952.

In January 1952, Cushing was appointed as an associate justice of the Vermont Supreme Court, filling the vacancy caused by the death of Samuel H. Blackmer.  He remained on the court until June 1953, when he resigned because of ill health, and was succeeded by Paul A. Chase.

Death and burial
He died in St. Albans on September 23, 1957.  He was buried at Greenwood Cemetery in St. Albans.

Family
In 1912, Cushing married Bessie Morton of St. Albans (1883-1961), the daughter of Leonard J. and Emma Morton.  They were the parents of a son, Morton (1921-1963).

References

Sources

Newspapers

Books

1884 births
1957 deaths
Politicians from Nashua, New Hampshire
People from St. Albans, Vermont
Dartmouth College alumni
Middlebury College alumni
U.S. state supreme court judges admitted to the practice of law by reading law
Vermont lawyers
Vermont Republicans
State's attorneys in Vermont
National Guard (United States) officers
United States Army personnel of World War I
Justices of the Vermont Supreme Court
Burials in Vermont
Vermont National Guard personnel
20th-century American judges
20th-century American lawyers